Paramicromerys is a genus of Malagasy cellar spiders that was first described by J. Millot in 1946.

Species
 it contains fourteen species, found only on Madagascar:
Paramicromerys betsileo Huber, 2003 – Madagascar
Paramicromerys coddingtoni Huber, 2003 – Madagascar
Paramicromerys combesi (Millot, 1946) – Madagascar
Paramicromerys madagascariensis (Simon, 1893) (type) – Madagascar
Paramicromerys mahira Huber, 2003 – Madagascar
Paramicromerys manantenina Huber, 2003 – Madagascar
Paramicromerys marojejy Huber, 2003 – Madagascar
Paramicromerys megaceros (Millot, 1946) – Madagascar
Paramicromerys nampoinai Huber, 2003 – Madagascar
Paramicromerys quinteri Huber, 2003 – Madagascar
Paramicromerys rabeariveloi Huber, 2003 – Madagascar
Paramicromerys ralamboi Huber, 2003 – Madagascar
Paramicromerys rothorum Huber, 2003 – Madagascar
Paramicromerys scharffi Huber, 2003 – Madagascar

See also
 List of Pholcidae species

References

Araneomorphae genera
Pholcidae
Spiders of Madagascar